Hans Klingenberg (born January 11, 1946) is the former Danish ambassador to Saudi Arabia, Kuwait, Bahrain, Oman, Qatar, Yemen and the United Arab Emirates. He is now the ambassador to the Vatican.

External links
CV at Danish Embassy Bern

1946 births
Living people
Danish diplomats
Ambassadors of Denmark to Kuwait
Ambassadors of Denmark to Bahrain
Ambassadors of Denmark to Oman
Ambassadors of Denmark to Qatar
Ambassadors of Denmark to Yemen
Ambassadors of Denmark to Saudi Arabia
Ambassadors of Denmark to the United Arab Emirates
Ambassadors of Denmark to the Holy See
Ambassadors of Denmark to Liechtenstein